Made Series (stylized in all caps) is the fifth Japanese-language studio album by South Korean boy band Big Bang. The album was released in Japan through YGEX on February 3, 2016. The eleven tracks includes Japanese versions of three of the group's Korean hits and the original eight songs from 4 single albums released in 2015.

Release 
The album was released in seven different editions, including CD, Blu-ray, Photo book, music videos, dance videos, making of mv and live performance a-nation Stadium Festival 2015. On January 6, 2016, the Japanese music video of "Loser" and "Bang Bang Bang" were released on their official channel on YouTube.

Reception and chart performance 
The album sold 80,262 copies on the first day and charted at number one on Oricon daily album chart, then in the first week the album sold 128,000 copies, breaking their own record of first-week sales which held by their previous album The Best of Big Bang 2006-2014 in 2014. In the year end the album sold 201,227, ranking 20th on the best-selling album in Japan, and becomes the highest-charting album for Korean artist in 2016.

The album was chosen as one of the best Japanese albums in 2016 by KKBox, while the Japanese version of "Bang Bang Bang" ranked 1st place on the top 10 track in Japan, and praising the song as energetic, and calling it a classical song from the band.

The album won three awards in 31st Japan Gold Disc Award, best 3 albums in Asia, and the Japanese version of "Bang Bang Bang" won song of the year by download.

Track listing

Charts

Weekly charts

Year-end charts

Certifications and sales figures

Release history

References

External links
 
 
Big Bang Official Site
Big Bang Japanese Official Site

BigBang (South Korean band) albums
2016 albums
YG Entertainment albums
Avex Group albums
Japanese-language albums
Albums produced by Teddy Park
Albums produced by G-Dragon